Parabyrsopolis chihuahuae is a beetle of the family Scarabaeidae.

Gallery

References 

Scarabaeidae
Beetles described in 1888